The Rhodesian Security Forces were the military forces of the Rhodesian government. The Rhodesian Security Forces consisted of a ground force (the Rhodesian Army), the Rhodesian Air Force, the British South Africa Police, and various personnel affiliated to the Rhodesian Ministry of Internal Affairs. Despite the impact of economic and diplomatic sanctions, Rhodesia was able to develop and maintain a potent and professional military capability.

The Rhodesian Security Forces of 1964–80 traced their history back to the British South Africa Company armed forces, originally created during company rule in the 1890s. These became the armed forces of the British self-governing colony of Southern Rhodesia on its formation in 1923, then part of the Federation of Rhodesia and Nyasaland military in 1953. After the break-up of the Federation at the end of 1963, the security forces assumed the form they would keep until 1980.

As the armed forces of Rhodesia (as Southern Rhodesia called itself from 1964), the Rhodesian Security Forces remained loyal to the Salisbury government after it unilaterally declared independence from Britain on 11 November 1965. Britain and the United Nations refused to recognise this, and regarded the breakaway state as a rebellious British colony throughout its existence.

The security forces fought on behalf of the unrecognised government against the Zimbabwe African National Liberation Army and the Zimbabwe People's Revolutionary Army—the military wings of the Marxist–Leninist black nationalist Zimbabwe African National Union and Zimbabwe African People's Union respectively—during the Rhodesian Bush War of the 1960s and 1970s.

The Lancaster House Agreement and the return of Rhodesia to de facto British control on 12 December 1979 changed the security forces' role altogether; during the five-month interim period, they helped the British governor and Commonwealth Monitoring Force to keep order in Rhodesia while the 1980 general election was organised and held. After the internationally recognised independence of Zimbabwe in April 1980, the Rhodesian security forces, the Zimbabwe African National Liberation Army and the Zimbabwe People's Revolutionary Army were integrated to form the new Zimbabwe Defence Forces. Around 5,000 white Rhodesian military and intelligence personnel were recruited by South Africa in 1980 as part of Operation Winter.

Rhodesian Army 

The majority of the Southern Rhodesia Volunteers were disbanded in 1920 for reasons of cost, the last companies being disbanded in 1926. The Defence Act of 1927 created a Permanent Force (the Rhodesian Staff Corps) and a Territorial Force as well as national compulsory military training. With the Southern Rhodesia Volunteers disbanded in 1927, the Rhodesia Regiment was reformed in the same year as part of the nation's Territorial Force. The 1st Battalion was formed in Salisbury with a detached "B" company in Umtali and the 2nd Battalion in Bulawayo with a detached "B" Company in Gwelo. Between the World Wars, the Permanent Staff Corps of the Rhodesian Army consisted of only 47 men. The British South Africa Police were trained as both policemen and soldiers until 1954.

About 10,000 white Southern Rhodesians (15% of the white population) mustered into the British forces during the Second World War, serving in units such as the Long Range Desert Group, the Rhodesian Armoured Corps, No. 237 Squadron RAF and the Special Air Service (SAS). Pro rata to population, this was the largest contribution of manpower by any territory in the British Empire, even outstripping that of Britain itself. Southern Rhodesia was in fact the first Commonwealth country to officially declare war on the Axis powers.

Southern Rhodesia's own units, most prominently the Rhodesian African Rifles (made up of black rank-and-filers and warrant officers, led by white officers; abbreviated RAR), fought in the war's East African Campaign and in Burma. During the war, Southern Rhodesian pilots proportionally earned the highest number of decorations and ace appellations in the Empire. This resulted in the Royal Family paying an unusual state visit to the colony at the end of the war in thanks to the efforts of the Rhodesian people.

The Southern Rhodesia Air Force (SRAF) was re-established in 1947 and, two years later, Prime Minister Sir Godfrey Huggins appointed a 32-year-old South African-born Rhodesian Spitfire pilot, Ted Jacklin, as air officer commanding tasked to build an air force in the expectation that British African territories would begin moving towards independence, and air power would be vital for land-locked Southern Rhodesia. The threadbare SRAF bought, borrowed or salvaged a collection of vintage aircraft, including six Tiger Moths, six North American Harvard trainers, an Avro Anson freighter and a handful of De Havilland Rapide transport aircraft, before purchasing a squadron of 22 Mk. 22 war surplus Supermarine Spitfire from the Royal Air Force (RAF) which were then flown to Southern Rhodesia.

In April 1951, the defence forces of Southern Rhodesia were completely reorganised. The Permanent Force included the British South Africa Police as well as the Southern Rhodesia Staff Corps, charged with training and administering the Territorial Force. The SRAF consisted of a communication squadron and trained members of the Territorial Force as pilots, particularly for artillery observation. During the Malayan Emergency of the 1950s, Southern Rhodesia contributed two units to the Commonwealth's counter-insurgency campaign: the newly formed Rhodesian SAS served a two-year tour of duty in Malaya starting in March 1951, then the Rhodesian African Rifles operated for two years from April 1956.

The colony also maintained women's auxiliary services (later to provide the inspiration for the Rhodesia Women's Service), and maintained a battalion of the RAR, officered by members of the Staff Corps. The Territorial Force remained entirely white and largely reproduced the Second World War pattern. It consisted of two battalions of the Royal Rhodesia Regiment, an Armoured Car Regiment, Artillery, Engineers, Signal Corps, Medical Corps, Auxiliary Air Force and Transport Corps. In wartime the country could also draw on the Territorial Force Reserve and General Reserve. Southern Rhodesia, in other words, reverted more or less to the organisation of the Second World War.

Matters evolved greatly over twenty years. The regular army was always a relatively small force, but by 1978–79 it consisted of 10,800 regulars nominally supported by about 40,000 reservists. While the regular army consisted of a professional core drawn from the white population (and some units, such as the Rhodesian SAS and the Rhodesian Light Infantry, were all-white), by 1978–79 the majority of its complement was actually composed of black soldiers. The army reserves, in contrast, were largely white.

The Rhodesian Army HQ was in Salisbury and commanded over four infantry brigades and later an HQ Special Forces, with various training schools and supporting units. Numbers 1,2, and 3 Brigade were established in 1964 and 4 Brigade in 1978.

1 Bde – Bulawayo with area of responsibility in Matabeleland
2 Bde – Salisbury with area of responsibility in Mashonaland
3 Bde – Umtali with area of responsibility in Manicaland
4 Bde – Fort Victoria with area of responsibility in Victoria province

During the Bush War, the army included:
Army Headquarters 
The Rhodesian Light Infantry
C Squadron (Rhodesian) SAS (in 1978 became 1 (Rhodesian) Special Air Service Regiment)
Selous Scouts
The Rhodesian Armoured Car Regiment (The Black Devils)
Grey's Scouts 
The Rhodesian African Rifles
The Rhodesia Regiment (eight battalions, numbered 1, 2, 4, 5, 6, 8, 9, 10); also National Service independent companies numbered 1–6 and, briefly, 7), though at times one or more of these independent companies were attached to the RAR during the Bush War.
Psychological Action Group (Psyac)
The Rhodesian Defence Regiment (two battalions)
The Rhodesian Intelligence Corps
The Rhodesian Artillery (one depot, one field regiment)
Six Engineer Squadrons (numbered 2, 3, 4, 6, 7) 1 Engr Sqn
5 Engineer Support Squadron
1 Brigade
Headquarters Abbreviation: HQ 1 Bde
Signals Squadron Abbreviation: 1(Bde) Sig Sqn
2 Brigade
Headquarters Abbreviation: HQ 2 Bde
Signals Squadron Abbreviation: 2(Bde) Sig Sqn
12 Signals Squadron Abbreviation: 2(Bde) 12 Sig Sqn
Located: Llewellyn Barracks
3 Brigade
Headquarters Abbreviation: HQ 3 Bde
Signals Squadron Abbreviation: 3(Bde) Sig Sqn
4 Brigade
Headquarters Abbreviation: HQ 4 Bde
41 Troop, Signals Squadron Abbreviation: 41 Tp 4(Bde) SigSqn
Two Services Area HQs (Matabeleland and Mashonaland)
Two Ordnance and Supplies Depots (Bulawayo, Salisbury)
Two Base Workshops (Bulawayo, Salisbury)
1 Air Supply Platoon
Three Maintenance Companies (numbered 1 to 3)
Three Medical Companies (1, 2, 5) and the Army Health Unit
Tsanga Lodge
Five Provost Platoons (numbered 1 to 5) and the Army Detention Barracks
Six Pay Companies (numbered 1 to 5, 7)
Rhodesian Army Education Corps
Rhodesian Corps of Chaplains
Army Records, and Army Data Processing Unit
Rail Transport Organisation Platoon
1 Military Postal Platoon
Training establishments: School of Infantry, 19 Corps Training Depot, School of Military Engineering, School of Signals, Services Training School, Services Trade Training Centre, Medical Training School, School of Military Police, Pay Corps Training School, School of Military Administration.

Ranks

Rhodesian Air Force 

The Royal Rhodesian Air Force (RRAF), as it was named in 1954, was never a large air force. In 1965, it consisted of only 1,200 regular personnel. It was renamed as the Rhodesian Air Force (RhAF) in 1970. At the peak of its strength during the Bush War, it had a maximum of 2,300 personnel of all races, but of these, only 150 were pilots actively involved in combat operations. These pilots, however, were rotated through the various squadrons partly to maintain their skills on all aircraft and partly to relieve fellow pilots flying more dangerous sorties.

Ranks

British South Africa Police 

The police force of Rhodesia was the British South Africa Police. They were the main first line of defense in both Southern Rhodesia and, later, Rhodesia, with the specific responsibility of maintaining law and order in the country.

BSAP units:
 British South Africa Police ('The Regiment')
 Police Anti-Terrorist Unit (PATU)
 Support Unit (the 'Black Boots')
 Special Branch
 SB-Scouts
 Police Mounted Unit
 Urban Emergency Unit (SWAT)
 Police Reserve

Rhodesian Ministry of Internal Affairs

While not a part of the Security Forces, Rhodesian Ministry of Internal Affairs officers were heavily involved in implementing such civic measures as the protected villages programme during the Bush War. The INTAF consisted by District Assistants and District Security Assistants, and led by District Commissioners.

 Administrative Reinforcement Unit (ARU)

Prison services 

The Rhodesia Prison Service was the branch of the Rhodesian Security Forces responsible for the administration of Rhodesian prisons.

Guard Force 

This was the fourth arm of the Rhodesian Security Forces. It consisted of both black and white troops whose initial role was to provide protection for villagers in the Protected Village system. During the latter stages of the Bush War they provided a role in the protection of white-owned farmland, tribal purchase lands and other strategic locations. They also raised three infantry Battalions and provided troops in every facet of the war in each of the Operational Areas. It was a large component of the Security Forces, with a strength of over 7,200 personnel. Its headquarters were in North Avenue, Salisbury. Its training establishment was based at Chikurubi in Salisbury.

The guard force cap badge was a castle on top of a dagger, below the castle was a scroll reading 'Guard Force'

Auxiliary Army (Pfumo reVanhu)

Combined operations 

The Rhodesian Bush War required that each of the security forces work in a combined effort to combat the enemy. Therefore, it became essential to establish an organisation known as Combined Operations Headquarters (COMOPS) in Salisbury to co-ordinate the efforts of each service. The Rhodesian army took the senior role in Combined Operations and was responsible for the conduct of all operations both inside and outside Rhodesia. COMOPS had direct command over the Joint Operational Centres (JOCs) deployed throughout the country in each of the Operational Areas. There was a JOC per Operational Area.

The operational areas were known as:
Operation Hurricane – North-east border, started in December 1972
Operation Thrasher – Eastern border, started in February 1976
Operation Repulse – South-east border, started in May 1976
Operation Tangent – Matabeleland, started in August 1976
Operation Grapple – Midlands, started in August 1977
Operation Splinter – Kariba, started in June 1977
Salops – Operations in and around Salisbury, started in 1978

Senior military officials in Rhodesia 
Source: original regiments.org (T.F. Mills) via webarchive.
Commandant, Southern Rhodesia Defence Force: 	
19uu 	Col. George Parson, CBE, DSO	
1936.10.09 	Brig. John Sidney Morris, CBE, KStJ, KPM, CPM 	
Commander Military Forces
Col D. S. H. Somerville (1939–40)
Brig J. W. Watson (1940–43)
Brig E. R. Day (1943-)
1947 	Maj-Gen Storr "Dooley" Garlake, CBE
Chief of the General Staff: 	
1953 	        Maj-Gen Storr "Dooley" Garlake, CBE
1959.04.12 	Maj-Gen Robert Edward Beaumont Long, CBE 	
1963.06 	Maj-Gen John Anderson, CBE 	
1964.10.24 	Maj-Gen Rodney Roy Jensen Putterill, CBE
GOC Rhodesian Army:	
1968.10 	Lt-Gen Keith Robert Coster, OBE, ICD, SASS	
Commander of the Rhodesian Army: 	
1972.08 Lt-Gen George Peter Walls GLM DCD MBE  	  	
1977.05.16 Lt-Gen John Selwyn Varcoe Hickman, OLM, MC 	
1979.03.08 	Lt-Gen A.L.C. 'Sandy' Maclean, OLM, DCD

Military equipment of Rhodesia

Small arms

Missiles and Recoilless Rifles

Vehicles

Artillery

Air Defence

Air force equipment

See also
British South Africa Police
Rhodesian Light Infantry
Selous Scouts
Grey's Scouts
Rhodesian African Rifles
Rhodesian Armoured Corps
Rhodesian Air Force
Fireforce
Security Force Auxiliaries

Notes and references
References

Journal articles

Bibliography

Further reading

 Hickman, A.S., Rhodesia Served the Queen.  Rhodesian Forces in the Boer War, 1899–1902, Volume I, Government Printers, Salisbury, Rhodesia, 1970.
 Hickman, A.S., Rhodesia Served the Queen.  Rhodesian Forces in the Boer War, 1899–1902, Volume II, Government Printers, Salisbury, Rhodesia, 1975.
 Lovett, John, Contact: A Tribute to Those Who Serve Rhodesia, Galaxie Press, Salisbury, Rhodesia, 1977.
 MacDonald, J.F., The War History of Southern Rhodesia 1939–45, Volume I.  Government of Southern Rhodesia, Salisbury, Southern Rhodesia, 1947.
 MacDonald, J.F.  The War History of Southern Rhodesia 1939–45, Volume II, Rhodesiana Reprint Library, Silver Series Volume 11, Books of Rhodesia, Bulawayo, 1976 reprint.
 Wood, J.R.T. (ed.), The War Diaries of Andre Dennison, Ashanti Press, Gibraltar, 1989.

External links
Rhodesian Militaria: Army – Detailed photos & descriptions of genuine Army & Brigade patches.
http://rhodesianforces.org
http://www.rhodesia.nl
http://www.baragwanath.co.za/leopard – Rhodesian 'Leopard' Mine Protected Vehicle on display at the War Museum, Johannesburg.

Armies by country
Disbanded armies
Disbanded armed forces
Military of Rhodesia
Military units and formations established in 1964
Military units and formations disestablished in 1980